The Big 12 Conference is a college athletic conference headquartered in Irving, Texas, USA. It consists of ten full-member universities. It is a member of  Division I of the National Collegiate Athletic Association (NCAA) for all sports. Its football teams compete in the Football Bowl Subdivision (FBS; formerly Division I-A), the higher of two levels of NCAA Division I football competition. Its 10 members, in the states of Iowa, Kansas, Oklahoma, Texas and West Virginia, include two private Christian universities and eight public universities. Additionally, the Big 12 has 12 affiliate members — eight for the sport of wrestling, one for women's equestrianism, one for women's gymnastics and two for women's rowing. The Big 12 Conference is a 501(c)(3) nonprofit organization. Brett Yormark became the new commissioner on August 1, 2022.

The Big 12 Conference was founded in February 1994. The eight members of the former Big Eight Conference joined with the Southwest Conference universities University of Texas at Austin, Texas A&M University, Baylor University and Texas Tech University to form the conference, with play beginning in 1996. The conference's current ten campus makeup resulted from the 2010–2013 Big 12 Conference realignment, in which Nebraska joined the Big Ten Conference, Colorado joined the Pac-12, and Texas A&M and Missouri joined the Southeastern Conference. Texas Christian University and West Virginia University joined from the Mountain West and Big East Conferences respectively to offset two of the departing universities, bringing the conference to its current strength.  In 2021, Texas and Oklahoma announced plans to move to the SEC in 2025. The Big 12 Conference then invited Brigham Young University, the University of Central Florida, the University of Cincinnati, and the University of Houston; all four schools will join in 2023. Oklahoma and Texas will depart the Big 12 for the Southeastern Conference on July 1, 2024.

The Big 12 Conference, like others involved in the realignment, has kept its name primarily for marketing purposes. The conference has high name recognition and remains one of the Power Five conferences, the five highest-earning and most historically successful FBS football conferences; Power Five conferences have provided nearly all participants in the College Football Playoff since its inception, are guaranteed at least one bid to a New Year's Six bowl game, and have been granted autonomy from certain NCAA rules.

Member universities

Current members
Members that have announced they are departing are highlighted in red.

Notes

Departing members

Future members

Affiliate members

Notes

 On July 29, 2015, the Big 12 announced it would add the six former members of the Western Wrestling Conference—Air Force, Northern Colorado, North Dakota State, South Dakota State, Utah Valley, and Wyoming—as affiliate members for wrestling, plus Denver as an affiliate member for women's gymnastics, all effective with the 2015–16 academic year. On July 5, 2017, the Big 12 added Fresno State and Northern Iowa as wrestling affiliates. On May 2, 2019, the Big 12 added Fresno State as an equestrian affiliate. Fresno State would drop wrestling in 2021, but remains an equestrian affiliate. Big 12 wrestling added former full member Missouri in 2021.

Former members

Notes

Former affiliate members

Notes

Membership timeline

Sports
The Big 12 Conference sponsors championship competition in ten men's and thirteen women's NCAA sanctioned sports.

Men's sponsored sports by university
Below are the men's sports sponsored by each member institution. The only sports with full participation by the entire conference are basketball, football, and golf. Swimming and diving have the lowest participation with only three universities fielding a team; one of these three (Texas) has announced its departure, but future full members BYU and Cincinnati also sponsor the sport. The conference fields 13 teams for wrestling, the most of any sport, with only four teams being full-time members, as well as nine affiliate members.

Departing members are highlighted in red.

 

 
Men's (and Coed – see Rifle) varsity sports not sponsored by the Big 12 Conference which are played by Big 12 universities:

Women's sponsored sports by university
Below are women's sports sponsored by the member institutions. Six sports have full participation from the entire conference, including future members: basketball, cross country, soccer, tennis, indoor track and outdoor track. Equestrian and gymnastics have the lowest participation with three full-time members and one affiliate participating; while gymnastics will lose a full-time member once Oklahoma departs, future member BYU sponsors the sport.

Women's (and co-educational – see Rifle) varsity sports not sponsored by the Big 12 Conference which are played by Big 12 universities:

 In addition to the above, UCF lists its coeducational cheerleading and all-female dance teams as varsity teams on its official athletic website.

History

The Big 12 Conference was formed in February 1994 when four prominent universities from Texas that were members of the Southwest Conference were invited to join the eight members of the Big Eight Conference to form a new 12 member conference. The Big 12 does not claim the Big Eight's history as its own, even though it was essentially the Big Eight plus the four Texas universities.

The Big 12 began athletic play in fall 1996, with the Texas Tech vs. Kansas State football game being the first-ever sports event staged by the conference. From its formation until 2011, its 12 members competed in two divisions in most sports. The Oklahoma and Texas universities formed the South Division, while the other six teams of the former Big Eight formed the North Division.

Between 2011 and 2012 four charter members left the conference, while two universities joined in 2012. A decade later, Oklahoma and Texas notified the Big 12 Conference that the two universities do not wish to extend their grant of television rights beyond the 2024–25 athletic year. On July 27, 2021, Oklahoma and Texas sent a joint letter to the Southeastern Conference requesting an invitation for membership beginning July 1, 2025. On July 29, 2021, the 14 presidents and chancellors of SEC member universities voted unanimously to invite Oklahoma and Texas to join the SEC. The following day, the Texas Board of Regents and Oklahoma Board of Regents each accepted the invitation to join the SEC from July 1, 2025. On September 10, 2021, the Big 12 announced that invitations had been extended to and accepted by BYU, a football independent and otherwise a member of the non-football West Coast Conference, and three members of the American Athletic Conference in Cincinnati, UCF, and Houston. These moves, combined with the impending departure of Oklahoma and Texas, would once again increase the Big 12's membership to twelve schools. All four schools will begin competing in Big 12 athletics beginning in fall 2023. BYU had initially announced that it would join in 2023, and Houston indicated it could do so as well. On June 10, 2022, The American and its three departing members announced a buyout agreement that allowed those schools to join the Big 12 in 2023.

Distinctive elements

Football championship game takes hiatus, returns in 2017
The Big 12 is unique among the current "Power Five" conferences in that it only has 10 members, despite the name, causing some confusion. From 1987 to 2015, 12 or more members were required for an "exempt" conference championship game—that is, one that did not count against NCAA limits for regular-season games (currently 12 in FBS)—although the first such game was not established until the SEC did so in 1992. Since the 2014 season, the Pac-12 has 12 members, ACC has 15 members, Big Ten and SEC have 14 football members each.

Former Texas Athletic Director DeLoss Dodds and former football coach Mack Brown, along with Oklahoma football coach Bob Stoops, preferred not to have a championship game. Critics argued it was a competitive advantage over other contract conferences. Conferences with a championship game have their division champions typically play one of their toughest games of the year in the last week of the regular season.  Unlike the other "Power 5" conferences in which a team only plays a portion of the other teams in the conference each season, each Big 12 team plays the other nine teams during its conference schedule.  This theoretically allows for the declaration of a de facto champion without the need for an additional rematch between the top two teams in the conference.

On June 3, 2016, the conference announced it would reinstate the football championship game in the 2017 season. This followed the passage of a new NCAA rule allowing all FBS conferences to hold "exempt" football championship games regardless of their membership numbers.

Population base
The Big 12 universities are located in the states of Texas, Oklahoma, Iowa, Kansas, and West Virginia. These states have a combined population of 37.8 million.

In 2013, of the 115.6 million TV households nationwide there were 13,427,130 TV households in those states (11.6%), although Morgantown, West Virginia where WVU is based is in the Pittsburgh television market, which increases the Big 12's television base well into Pennsylvania, and Lawrence, Kansas, where KU is based, is in the Kansas City television market, increasing the base into western Missouri.

The pending additions of BYU, Cincinnati, and UCF will expand its market share with the addition of the Orlando (ranked 17th nationally), Salt Lake City (30th) and Cincinnati (36th) TV markets.

The Big 12's share of the nation's TVs is similar to that reached by the rest of the Power Five.  The conference negotiated tier 1 and 2 TV contracts with total payouts similar to those of the other Power Five conferences.

Grant of Rights
Member universities granted their first and second tier sports media rights to the conference for the length of their current TV deals. The Grant of Rights (GOR) deal with the leagues' TV contracts ensures that "if a Big 12 school leaves for another league in the next 13 years, that school's media rights, including revenue, would remain with the Big 12 and not its new conference".

GOR is seen by league members as a "foundation of stability" and allowed the Big 12 to be "positioned with one of the best media rights arrangements in collegiate sports, providing the conference and its members unprecedented revenue growth, and sports programming over two networks." All members agreed to the GOR and later agreed to extend the initial 6-year deal to 13 years to correspond to the length of their TV contracts.

Prior to this agreement, the Big Ten and Pac-12 also had similar GOR agreements. The Big 12 subsequently assisted the ACC in drafting its GOR agreement. Four of the five major conferences now have such agreements, with the SEC the only exception.

Tier 3 events

The Big 12 is the only major conference that allows members to monetize TV rights for tier 3 events in football and men's basketball. This allows individual Big 12 member institutions to create tier 3 deals that include TV rights for one home football game and four home men's basketball games per season. Tier 3 rights exist for other sports as well, but these are not unique to the Big 12. The unique arrangement potentially allows Big 12 members to remain some of college sports' highest revenue earners. Other conferences' cable deals are subject to value reductions based on how people acquire cable programming; Big 12 universities' tier 3 deals are exempt. Texas alone will earn more than $150 million of that total from their Longhorn Network.

As of 2022, all of the Big 12's tier 3 rights are held by ESPN; the network operates a joint venture with Learfield and the Texas Longhorns known as Longhorn Network, and ESPN bought the tier 3 rights to most Big 12 teams (besides Oklahoma) in 2019, moving the events exclusively to ESPN+. The Oklahoma Sooners retained an agreement with Bally Sports Oklahoma (which distributed its football game via pay-per-view) until 2022, when it also sold its rights to ESPN+.

Revenue

Conference revenue comes mostly from television contracts, bowl games, the NCAA, merchandise, licensing and conference-hosted sporting events. The Conference distributes revenue annually to member institutions. From 1996 to 2011, 57 percent of revenue was allotted equally; while 43 percent was based upon the number of football and men's basketball television appearances and other factors. In 2011, the distribution was 76 percent equal and 24 percent based on television appearances. Changing the arrangement requires a unanimous vote; as a Big 12 member, Nebraska and Texas A&M had withheld support for more equitable revenue distribution.

With this model, larger universities can receive more revenue because they appear more often on television. In 2006, for example, Texas received $10.2 million, 44% more than Baylor University's $7.1 million.

Big 12 revenue was generally less than other BCS conferences; this was due in part to television contracts signed with Fox Sports Net (four years for $48 million) and ABC/ESPN (eight years for $480 million).

In 2011, the Big 12 announced a new 13-year media rights deal with Fox that would ensure that every Big 12 home football game is televised, as well as greatly increasing coverage of women's basketball, conference championships and other sports. The deal, valued at an estimated $1.1 billion, runs until 2025. In 2012, the conference announced a new agreement with Fox and ESPN, replacing the current ABC/ESPN deal, to immediately increase national media broadcasts of football and increase conference revenue; the new deal was estimated to be worth $2.6 billion through the 2025 expiration. The two deals pushed the conference per-university payout to approximately $20 million per year, while separating third-tier media rights into separate deals for each university; such contracts secured an additional $6 million to $20 million per university annually. The per-university payout under the deal is expected to reach $44 million, according to Commissioner Bob Bowlsby.

In 2022, the conference renewed its media rights with ESPN and Fox Sports for six seasons starting in 2025–26, with an estimated US$380 million average annual fee.

Revenue ranking (old statistics)
Revenue includes ticket sales, contributions and donations, rights/licensing, student fees, university funds and all other sources including TV income, camp income, food and novelties. Total expenses includes coaching/staff, scholarships, buildings/ground, maintenance, utilities and rental fees and all other costs including recruiting, team travel, equipment and uniforms, conference dues and insurance costs. Data is from United States Department of Education.

Facilities
Departing members are in red and future members are in gray.

Apparel

* BYU, Cincinnati, Houston, and UCF set to join the Big 12 as a full members on July 1, 2023.** Oklahoma and Texas have accepted invitations to join the Southeastern Conference on July 1, 2024Championships

National championships
The following is a list of all NCAA, equestrian, and college football championships won by teams that were representing the Big 12 Conference in NCAA-recognized sports at the time of their championship. The most recent Big 12 team to win a national title is Texas Women's Volleyball. Only two years of the Big 12's existence has the conference not won at least one team National Title, 2007 and 2020. However, in 2020 multiple National Championships were not awarded due to the COVID-19 pandemic.

Football (3):
1997 – Nebraska
2000 – Oklahoma
2005 – Texas

Equestrian  (3):
2002 − Texas A&M 
2012 – Texas A&M 
2022 – Oklahoma State 

Baseball (2):
2002 – Texas
2005 – Texas

Men's basketball (3):
2008 – Kansas
2021 – Baylor
2022 – Kansas

Women's basketball (4):
2005 – Baylor
2011 – Texas A&M
2012 – Baylor
2019 – Baylor

Women's Bowling (5):
1999 – Nebraska
2001 – Nebraska
2004 – Nebraska
2005 – Nebraska
2009 – Nebraska

Men's Cross Country (6):
2001 – Colorado
2004 – Colorado
2006 – Colorado
2009 – Oklahoma State
2010 – Oklahoma State
2012 – Oklahoma State

Women's Cross Country (2):
2000 – Colorado
2004 – Colorado

Men's golf (6):
2000 – Oklahoma State
2006 – Oklahoma State
2009 – Texas A&M
2012 – Texas
2017 – Oklahoma
2018 – Oklahoma State
2022 – Texas

Rifle (6):
2013 – West Virginia
2014 – West Virginia
2015 – West Virginia
2016 – West Virginia
2017 – West Virginia
2019 – TCU

Women's gymnastics (5):
2014 – Oklahoma
2016 – Oklahoma
2017 – Oklahoma
2019 – Oklahoma
2022 – Oklahoma

Men's gymnastics (9):
2002 – Oklahoma
2003 – Oklahoma
2005 – Oklahoma
2006 – Oklahoma
2008 – Oklahoma
2015 – Oklahoma
2016 – Oklahoma
2017 – Oklahoma
2018 – Oklahoma

Women's Indoor Track (3):
1998 – Texas
1999 – Texas
2006 – Texas

Men's Outdoor Track (4):
2009 – Texas A&M
2010 – Texas A&M
2011 – Texas A&M
2019 – Texas Tech

Women's Outdoor Track (7):
1998 – Texas
1999 – Texas
2005 – Texas
2009 – Texas A&M
2010 – Texas A&M
2011 – Texas A&M
2013 – Kansas

Women's Rowing (2):
2021 – Texas
2022 – Texas

Men's/Women's Skiing (4):
1998 – Colorado
1999 – Colorado
2006 – Colorado
2011 – Colorado

Softball (6):
2000 – Oklahoma
2013 – Oklahoma
2016 – Oklahoma
2017 – Oklahoma
2021 – Oklahoma
2022 – Oklahoma

Men's Swimming (10):
1996 – Texas
2000 – Texas
2001 – Texas
2002 – Texas
2010 – Texas
2015 – Texas
2016 – Texas
2017 – Texas
2018 – Texas
2021 – Texas

Men's Tennis (2):
2004 – Baylor
2019 – Texas

Women's Tennis (2):
2021 – Texas
2022 – Texas

Women's volleyball (4):
2000 – Nebraska
2006 – Nebraska
2012 – Texas
2022 – Texas

Wrestling (4):
2003 – Oklahoma State
2004 – Oklahoma State
2005 – Oklahoma State
2006 – Oklahoma State

National team titles by institution

The national championships listed below are as of March 2016. Football, Helms, pre-NCAA competition and overall equestrian titles are included in the total, but excluded from the column listing NCAA and AIAW titles.

Conference champions

The Conference sponsors 23 sports, 10 men's and 13 women's.

In football, divisional titles were awarded based on regular-season conference results, with the teams with the best conference records from the North and South playing in the Big 12 Championship Game  from 1996 to 2010. Baseball, basketball, softball, tennis and women's soccer titles are awarded in both regular-season and tournament play. Cross country, golf, gymnastics, swimming and diving, track and field, and wrestling titles are awarded during an annual meet of participating teams. The volleyball title is awarded based on regular-season play.

Conference titles by university
All-Time Big 12 Championships by university
Through July 1, 2022.

Note, includes both regular-season, tournament titles, and co-championships. List does not include conference championships won prior to the formation of the Big 12 Conference in 1996.

Football

The first football game in conference play was Texas Tech vs. Kansas State in 1996, won by Kansas State, 21–14.

From 1996 to 2010, Big 12 Conference teams played eight conference games a season. Each team faced all five opponents within its own division and three teams from the opposite division. Inter-divisional play was a "three-on, three-off" system, where teams would play three teams from the other division on a home-and-home basis for two seasons, and then play the other three foes from the opposite side for a two-year home-and-home.

This format came under considerable criticism, especially from Nebraska and Oklahoma, who were denied a yearly match between two of college football's most storied programs. The Nebraska-Oklahoma rivalry was one of the most intense in college football history. (Until 2006, the teams had never met in the Big 12 Championship.) Due to the departure of Nebraska and Colorado in 2011, the Big 12 eliminated the divisions (and championship game) and instituted a nine-game round-robin format. With the advent of the College Football Playoff committee looking at teams' strength of schedule for picking the four playoff teams, on December 8, 2015, the Big 12 announced an annual requirement for all Big 12 teams to schedule a non-conference game against a team from the four other Power Five conferences (plus Notre Dame). Per Big 12 commissioner Bob Bowlsby: "Schedule strength is a key component in CFP Selection Committee deliberations. This move will strengthen the resumes for all Big 12 teams. Coupled with the nine-game full round robin Conference schedule our teams play, it will not only benefit the teams at the top of our standings each season, but will impact the overall strength of the Conference."

Championship game

The Big 12 Championship Game game was approved by all members except Nebraska. It was held each year, commencing with the first match in the 1996 season at the Trans World Dome in St. Louis.  It pitted the division champions against each other after the regular season was completed.

Following the 2008 game, the event was moved to the new Cowboys Stadium in Arlington, Texas, being played there in 2009 and 2010. In 2010, the Sooners defeated the Cornhuskers 23–20.

After 2010, the game was moved to Arlington for 2011, 2012, and 2013. However, the decision became moot following the 2010 season because the league lacked sufficient members.

In April 2015, the ACC and the Big 12 developed new rules for the NCAA to deregulate conference championship games. The measure passed on January 14, 2016, allowing a conference with fewer than 12 teams to stage a championship game that does not count against the FBS limit of 12 regular-season games under either of the following circumstances:
 The game involves the top two teams following a full round-robin conference schedule.
 The game involves two divisional winners, each having played a full round-robin schedule in its division.

Under the first criterion, the Big 12 championship game resumed at the conclusion of the 2017 regular season, and is played during the first weekend of December, the time all other FBS conference championship games are played.

Bowl affiliations
The following were bowl games for the Big 12 for the 2022 season.

Rivalries

Rivalries (primarily in football) mostly predate the conference. The Kansas–Missouri rivalry was the longest running, the longest west of the Mississippi and the second longest in college football. It was played 119 times before Missouri left the Big 12. As of October 2012, the University of Kansas' athletic department had not accepted Missouri's invitations to play inter-conference rivalry games, putting the rivalry on hold. Sports clubs sponsored by the two universities continued to play each other. Kansas and Missouri renewed the rivalry in men's basketball starting in December 2021, and have announced that they will meet again in football in 2025.

The rivalry between TCU and Baylor, known as the Revivalry is also one of the longest running in college football, with the two universities having played each other — largely as Southwest Conference members — 114 times since 1899. Following the 2022 game, TCU leads the series 58–53–7.

The Oklahoma-Texas rivalry, the Red River Showdown is one year younger and has been played 108 times. This was a major rivalry decades before they were both in the conference, starting the year after the Revivalry in 1900. Following the 2022 game, Texas leads this rivalry 63–50–5.

Some of the longstanding football rivalries between Big 12 universities include:

 Rivalries with former members 

Men's basketball

From 1996 to 2011, standings in conference play were not split among divisions, although the schedule was structured as if they were. Teams played a home-and-home against teams within their divisions and a single game against teams from the opposite division for a total of 16 conference games. After Nebraska and Colorado left, Big 12 play transitioned to an 18-game, double round robin schedule.

Big 12 basketball teams currently play a "home and away" double round robin 18-game schedule, expanded from 16 games after the 2011 realignment. All teams in the conference qualify for the Big 12 tournament. From 1996–97 to 2010–11, teams played in-division members twice and non-division members only once. The conference tournament gave first round byes to the top four teams from 1997 through 2011, and the top six teams from 2012 onwards. When the conference temporarily expands to 14 members beginning with the 2023–24 season, the 18-game schedule will remain, but the double round-robin will be discontinued in favor of a new scheduling formula.

Conference champions

Kansas has the most Big 12 titles, winning or sharing the regular-season title 20 times in the league's 25 seasons, including 14 straight from 2004–05 to 2017–18. The 2002 Jayhawks became the first, and so far only, team to complete an undefeated Big 12 regular season, going 16–0. Though rematches between Big 12 regular season co-champions have happened in that year's Big 12 tournament, none have met in the ensuing NCAA Tournament.

In 2021–22, Kansas won the seeding tiebreaker over Baylor for the Big 12 Tournament, as Kansas had gone 1–1 against third place team Texas Tech, while Baylor had been swept by Texas Tech.

NCAA tournament performance
Totals through the end of the 2021–22 season.

All-time records

Totals through the end of the 2018–19 season.

All Time Series Record

Totals though the end of the 2020–21 season. Includes any regular season or postseason meetings.

Baseball

All current Big 12 members sponsor baseball except Iowa State, which dropped the sport after the 2001 season. All former Big 12 members sponsored the sport throughout their tenures in the conference except Colorado, which never sponsored baseball during its time in the Big 12.

By university
 As of the completion of the 2018 tournament.

Academics
Big 12 members are all doctorate-granting universities with "very high research activity," the highest classification given by the Carnegie Foundation for the Advancement of Teaching. All member schools are also highly ranked nationally and globally by various groups, including U.S. News & World Report, Washington Monthly, and Times Higher Education''.

Broadcasting and media rights 
The Big 12's media rights are controlled primarily by ESPN and Fox Sports, which reached a 13-year agreement in 2012 valued at $2.6 billion in total. The Big 12's top football rights are split between ESPN and Fox, while the basketball inventory is held by ESPN and CBS Sports. The agreement also included a grant of rights for all current Big 12 teams over the period of the contract.

In addition to the national agreement, each Big 12 university maintained the right to sell its "third-tier" covering selected events per-season (including one football game, basketball games, and other events outside of those sports). The third-tier rights to the Texas Longhorns are held through a channel dedicated to the team — Longhorn Network — which is operated by ESPN. In 2019, ESPN announced that it would acquire the third-tier rights to all Big 12 teams through 2024-25 (excluding Oklahoma and Texas, which are still under long-term contracts with ESPN+ and Longhorn Network respectively), and place their content on its subscription streaming service ESPN+. ESPN also acquired exclusive rights to all future Big 12 football championship games, replacing the previous alternation between ESPN and Fox.

References

External links
 

 
Sports organizations established in 1996
Sports in Irving, Texas
Articles which contain graphical timelines